Kosky is a surname. Notable people with the surname include:

Barrie Kosky (1967–), Australian theatre and opera director
Lynne Kosky (1958–2014), Australian politician
Paul Kosky, Australian music producer (see Killing Heidi)

See also

Similarly spelled surname
Koski:

Brian Koski, American football (soccer) TV journalist
Darius Koski, performer with the California punk rock band Swingin' Utters
Ilkka Koski (1928–1993), Finnish boxer
Jarmo Koski (1951–), Finnish actor
Koskie:
Corey Koskie (1973–), Canadian baseball player
Scott Koskie (1971–), Canadian volleyball player

Places
Koski Duże, a village in Poland
Koski Tl, a municipality in Finland